Philenora placochrysa is a moth in the subfamily Arctiinae. It was described by Turner in 1899. It is found in Queensland, Australia.

References

Moths described in 1899
Lithosiini